Carbon finance is a branch of environmental finance that covers financial tools such as carbon emission trading to reduce the impact of greenhouse gases (GHG) on the environment by giving carbon emissions a price.

Financial risks and opportunities impact corporate balance sheets, and market-based instruments are capable of transferring environmental risk and achieving environmental objectives. Issues regarding climate change and GHG emissions must be addressed as part of strategic management decision-making.

The general term is applied to investments in GHG emission reduction projects and the creation (origination) of financial instruments that are tradeable on the carbon market.

History
The market for the purchase of carbon has grown exponentially since its conception in 1996.

The following is the estimated size of the worldwide carbon market according to the World Bank:

Volume (millions metric tonnes, MtCO2)

  2005:      718 (330 in Main Allowances Markets & 388 in Project based transactions)
  2006:    1,745 (1,134 in Main Allowances Markets & 611 in Project based transactions)
  2007:    2,983 (2,109 in Main Allowances Markets & 874 in Project based transactions)

The 1997 Kyoto Protocol recognised Clean Development Mechanism (CDM) allowing the offset of emissions in developed countries by the investment in emission reduction projects in developing countries like China, India or Latin America.

Joint Implementation (JI), is another mechanism that allowed investments in developed countries to generate emission credit for the same or another developed country.

World Bank
The World Bank has created the World Bank Carbon Finance Unit (CFU). The World Bank CFU uses money contributed by governments and companies in OECD countries to purchase project-based greenhouse gas emission reductions in developing countries and countries with economies in transition. The emission reductions are purchased through one of the CFU's carbon funds on behalf of the contributor, and within the framework of the Kyoto Protocol's Clean Development Mechanism (CDM) or Joint Implementation (JI). The World Bank is particularly supportive of Program of Activities (PoA) development.

See also

Carbon price
Carbon tax
Emission trading
Carbon credits
Reforestation
Renewable energy payment
Carbon rationing
Verified Carbon Standard

References

External links

Carbon Finance Advisory
Carbon Finance TV
Carbon Finance International
Carbon Finance Services
Daily carbon finance news
Glossary of Terms

 
Corporate development